Xingnan is a station on the Taoyuan Airport MRT located in Zhongli, Taoyuan City, Taiwan. It opened for commercial service on 2 March 2017.

Overview
This elevated station has two side platforms with two tracks. Only Commuter trains stop at this station. It opened for trial service on 2 February 2017, and for commercial service 2 March 2017.

Construction on the station began on 18 September 2008, and opened for commercial service on 2 March 2017 with the opening of the Taipei-Huanbei section of the Airport MRT.

Around the Station
Goat World Ranch (羊世界牧場) (1.2km northwest of the station)

Exits
Exit 1: Section 1, Zhongfeng North Road

See also
 Taoyuan Metro

References

Railway stations opened in 2017
2017 establishments in Taiwan
Taoyuan Airport MRT stations